Grant A. Johnson is an American television soap opera director.

Positions held
Days of Our Lives
 Director (2007–Present)

General Hospital
 Director (January 15, 2004 - November 16, 2004)

Passions
 Director (2000–2003)

Santa Barbara
 Associate Director (1989–1993)
 Production Assistant

Sunset Beach
 Director (1998–1999)
 Offline Editor (1998)
 Associate Director (1997)

The Young and the Restless
Occasional Director (2008, 2009)
Production Associate (1986–1988)

Awards and nominations
Daytime Emmy Award
Win, 2018, Directing, Days of Our Lives
Win, 2005, Directing, General Hospital
Win, 1999, Editing, Sunset Beach
Nomination, 2001, 2003, 2004, Directing, Passions
Nomination, 2000, Directing, Sunset Beach

References

External links

Living people
Place of birth missing (living people)
Year of birth missing (living people)
American television directors
Daytime Emmy Award winners
American soap opera directors